Norbertas Vėlius (1 January 1938 in Gulbės, near Šilalė – 23 June 1996 in Vilnius, buried in the Antakalnis Cemetery) was a Lithuanian folklorist specializing in Lithuanian mythology.

Major works
Mitinės lietuvių sakmių būtybės (1977) 
Laumių dovanos (1979)  (translated into Russian as Цветок папоротника: литовские мифологические сказания in 1989, into English as Lithuanian mythological tales in 1998)
Senovės baltų pasaulėžiūra (1983)  (translated into English as The World Outlook of the Ancient Balts in 1989)
Chtoniškasis lietuvių mitologijos pasaulis (1987) 
Baltų religijos ir mitologijos šaltiniai, 4 volumes (1996–2005). 

1938 births
1996 deaths
Lithuanian mythology researchers
20th-century Lithuanian historians
People from Tauragė County
Burials at Antakalnis Cemetery